Hassi Gara is a town and commune in El Ménia District, Ghardaïa Province, Algeria. According to the 2008 census it has a population of 17,801, up from 13,911 in 1998, with an annual growth rate of 2.5%. It is effectively a suburb of the larger town El Goléa.

Geography 

Climate 

Hassi Gara has a hot desert climate (Köppen climate classification BWh), with very hot summers and cool winters. There is very little rain throughout the year, and summers are especially dry.

Transportation 

Hassi Gara is very close to El Goléa and there are many local roads that connect the two towns. The N1 runs through Hassi Gara, connecting Ghardaïa to the north to In Salah and Tamanrasset to the south.

Education 

6.1% of the population has a tertiary education, and another 15.9% has completed secondary education. The overall literacy rate is 81.1%, and is 85.3% among males and 76.9% among females.

Localities 
The commune of Hassi Gara is composed of six localities:

 Quartiers El Borr
 Hassi El Gara Ouest
 Hassi El Gara Est
 El Ouadjda
 Edjraïf
 Nebka

References 

Neighbouring towns and cities

Communes of Ghardaïa Province
El Ménia District
Ghardaïa Province